Madaphlocteis is a genus of beetles in the family Buprestidae, containing the following species:

 Madaphlocteis ambanjana (Obenberger, 1944)
 Madaphlocteis ampliata (Fairmaire, 1905)
 Madaphlocteis iridipennis (Obenberger, 1944)
 Madaphlocteis mucorea (Fairmaire, 1902)
 Madaphlocteis ochraceopicta (Fairmaire, 1888)
 Madaphlocteis perrieri (Fairmaire, 1900)
 Madaphlocteis polychroa (Fairmaire, 1904)
 Madaphlocteis purpureosignata (Hoscheck, 1931)
 Madaphlocteis simplicifrons (Fairmaire, 1901)

References

Buprestidae genera